Alticus anjouanae is a species of combtooth blenny (family Blenniidae) in the genus Alticus.  Fourmanoir originally placed this species in the genus Andamia. It is a tropical blenny known from Comoros, Seychelles, and Réunion, in the western Indian Ocean. Males can reach a maximum total length of 7.6 centimetres (2.99 inches). Blennies in this species are oviparous and form distinct pairs when mating. They feed primarily off of benthic algae and weeds.

References

External links

Fish described in 1955
anjouanae
Taxa named by Pierre Fourmanoir